Kvitholmen Lighthouse is a coastal lighthouse located in Hustadvika Municipality in Møre og Romsdal county, Norway. The lighthouse was established in 1842, rebuilt in 1956, and automated in 1990.

The light emits a white, red, or green light (depending on direction) occulting once every 6 seconds. The light is in operation from 16 July until 21 May every year. The light is shut off during the summers due to the midnight sun. The present lighthouse sits right next to the historic tower that was built in 1842. In 1956 the present tower was built to replace the old stone tower.

See also

 Lighthouses in Norway
 List of lighthouses in Norway

References

External links
 Norsk Fyrhistorisk Forening 

Lighthouses completed in 1842
Lighthouses in Møre og Romsdal
Hustadvika (municipality)
Listed lighthouses in Norway
1842 establishments in Norway